Valentina Scandolara (born 1 May 1990) is an Italian road bicycle racer, who currently rides for UCI Women's Continental Team .

Career
Scandolara was born in Soave. She showed great talent in sports from a very early age, winning three National Champion titles in Cross Country running and one in Futsal, before committing full-time to Cycling.

During the early stages of her professional career, she raced for Italian teams and was active on the Track and in Cyclocross, before being signed in 2014 from UCI number 1 ranked  and fully commit to Road Cycling.

In November 2015 she was announced as part of the inaugural squad for the  team for the 2016 season.

In September 2016 she was announced as part of the  squad for 2017.

She took a break from professional racing at the start of 2018 due to physical health problems, but she would return to racing at the end of February with the Maaslandster International Women's Cycling Team at the Setmana Ciclista Valenciana, before signing with Australian amateur team  to start a summer season of racing in the US at the end of April. In between the 2017 and 2018 racing seasons, Scandolara completed the UCI Sport Directors Diploma and the UCI Coaching Diploma.

After winning the overall classification in the Lexus of Blackburn Bay Classic Series in January 2019, she directed Sarah Gigante to a double title in the Australian National Road Race Championships and the Australian National Time Trial Championships in Ballarat (Victoria). She also worked as Sport Director for the Sydney University–Staminade Cycling Team during UCI competitions "Race Melbourne", "Cadel Evans Road Race" and "Herald Sun Tour" in January 2019.

In December 2020, Scandolara signed a contract to ride for the  team, for the 2021 season.

Personal life
In February 2019 she graduated in Psychology at the University of Padua, with a thesis on women's cycling titled "Mind over matter: Emotional Intelligence as an Important Predictor of Success in Professional Women's Cycling".

Major results
Sources:

Cycling

2004
 1st  Road race, National Novices Road Championships
 1st  Sprint, National Novices Track Championships
2005
 1st  Road race, National Novices Road Championships
 1st  Sprint, National Novices Track Championships
2006
 National Novices Road Championships
1st  Road race
2nd Time trial
 National Novices Track Championships
1st  Points race
1st  Individual pursuit
1st  Sprint
 1st  Novice race, National Cyclo-cross Championships
2007
 1st  Road race, UEC European Junior Road Championships
 3rd  Road race, UCI Juniors World Championships
2008
 1st  Road race, UEC European Junior Road Championships
 1st  Road race, National Junior Road Championships
 National Junior Track Championships
1st  Team pursuit
2nd 500m time trial
 2nd  Points race, UCI Junior Track World Championships
 UEC European Junior Track Championships
2nd  Scratch
3rd  Team pursuit
2009
 Track European Cup, Barcelona
1st  Points race
1st  Scratch
2010
 1st GP Union Vélocipédique Genevoise Lancy
 2nd Classica Citta di Padova
 3rd Prix des Vins Henri Valloton
 6th GP Comune di Cornaredo
2011
 1st  Points race, UEC Under-23 European Track Championships
 1st Giornata del Ciclismo Rosa a Nove
 2nd Trofeo Vannucci Alberto
 2nd GP Comune di Cornaredo
 3rd National Cyclo-cross Championships
 3rd Team sprint, National Track Championships
 5th Road race, UEC European Under-23 Road Championships
 7th GP Liberazione
2012
 National Cyclo-cross Championships
1st  Under-23 race
3rd Elite race
 6th Grand Prix de Dottignies
2013
 1st Draai van de Kaai
 1st Trofeo Vannucci Alberto
 1st Stage 6 Thüringen Rundfahrt der Frauen
 2nd Women's Bike Race Montignoso
 3rd National Cyclo-cross Championships
 3rd Ridderronde Maastricht
 4th Overall Trophée d'Or Féminin
 4th Overall Giro della Toscana Int. Femminile – Memorial Michela Fanini
 10th Overall Grand Prix Elsy Jacobs
1st Mountains classification
2014
 1st Giro del Trentino Alto Adige-Südtirol
 1st Draai van de Kaai
 2nd  Team time trial, UCI Road World Championships
 2nd Road race, National Road Championships
 2nd Overall Santos Tour Down Under
 7th Overall Ladies Tour of Norway
2015
 1st  Overall Santos Tour Down Under
1st Stage 1
 1st Melbourne Supercrit
 1st Stage 4 Tour Cycliste Féminin International de l'Ardèche
 2nd Overall Giro della Toscana Int. Femminile – Memorial Michela Fanini
1st  Points classification
 2nd Cadel Evans Great Ocean Road Race
 2nd Acht van Westerveld
 2nd SwissEver GP Cham-Hagendorn
 2nd Draai van de Kaai
 4th Overall Ladies Tour of Norway
 6th Road race, European Games
 10th Giro dell'Emilia Internazionale Donne Elite
2016
 1st Draai van de Kaai
 1st Melbourne Supercrit
 1st Stage 3 Bay Classic Series
 2nd Winston-Salem Cycling Classic
2017
 1st Overall Bay Classic Series
1st Stage 1
 1st Dwars door de Westhoek
2018
 1st Overall Intelligentsia Cup
1st Races 2, 3, 5, 6, 7 & 10
 1st USA Pro Road Tour Saint Francis Tulsa Tough – Race 3
 USA CRITS Natural State Criterium Series
1st Races 1 & 3
 Wilmington Grand Prix
1st Road race
1st Monkey Hill time trial
2019
 1st Overall Bay Classic Series

Other sports

Cross Country Running
2000
2nd CSI National Cross Country Running Championships, Rocca di Papa
2001
1st  CSI National Cross Country Running Championships, Rocca di Papa
2002
1st  CSI National Cross Country Running Championships, Fiuggi
2003
1st  CSI National Cross Country Running Championships, Paestum

Futsal
2006
1st  Italian National Futsal/soccer Championships (High school Team: Liceo Scientifico Messedaglia, Verona)

References

External links

1990 births
Living people
Italian female cyclists
Cyclists from the Province of Verona
Cyclists at the 2015 European Games
European Games competitors for Italy
Italian track cyclists